Henrique Teixeira de Queirós de Barros (7 October 1904, in Coimbra – 21 August 2000) was a Portuguese politician.

Background
Henrique was the son of João de Barros and his wife Raquel Teixeira de Queirós, and a paternal grandson of the 1st Viscount of Marinha Grande, of whom he was the representative. He was also a brother-in-law of Marcelo Caetano, the Prime Minister of Portugal during the final years of the Dictatorship.

Career
Henrique was a Licentiate in Agricultural Economics from the Instituto Superior de Agronomia of the University of Lisbon, and from there he developed an intense activity as a Pedagogue and an Investigator.

In opposition to the dictatorial regime of Estado Novo from a young age, he joined the Movimento de Unidade Democrática (MUD) in 1945. He joined the Socialist Party in 1974, and a year later he was elected a Deputy to the Constituent Assembly, of which he became the 1st and only President from 3 June 1975 to 2 April 1976. With this, his name got permanently connected with the Constitution of Portugal of 1976.

He then served as Minister of State of the 1st Constitutional Government and a Member of the Portuguese Council of State.

In 1981 he disconnected from PS and, from 1985, he started collaborating with the Democratic Renovator Party (PRD).

Family
He married Luísa de Morais Sarmento, from an ancient noble family of Trás os Montes e Alto Douro, without issue.

References

 Os Presidentes do Parlamento (Presidents of the Portuguese Parliament), Assembly of the Republic

1904 births
2000 deaths
People from Coimbra
Socialist Party (Portugal) politicians
Government ministers of Portugal
Democratic Renewal Party (Portugal) politicians